Govindarajan Padmanaban (born 20 March 1938, in Madras) is an Indian biochemist and biotechnologist. He was the former director of the Indian Institute of Science (IISc), and presently serves as honorary professor in the department of biochemistry at IISc and Chancellor of Central University of Tamil Nadu.

Early life and education
Padmanaban was brought up in a family of engineers. He belongs to Tanjore district of Tamil Nadu but had settled in Bangalore.  After completing his schooling in Bangalore, he joined an Engineering College. However, he found engineering uninteresting, and he joined the Presidency College in Madras to complete a bachelor's degree in chemistry. He completed his masters in Soil Chemistry at Indian Agricultural Research Institute, New Delhi and Ph.D. in Biochemistry at the Indian Institute of Science (IISc), Bangalore in 1966.

Research
In the early years of his research, he primarily worked in the transcriptional regulation of Eukaryotic genes in the liver. He was interested in elucidating the multifaceted role of heme in cellular processes. His group discovered the heme-biosynthetic pathway in the malarial parasite and showed it to be a drug target. He has also been interested in the area of vaccine development. His team was successful in showing the antimalarial property of Curcumin and its efficacy in combination therapy in 2004.

Awards
 Shanti Swarup Bhatnagar Prize for Science and Technology (1983)
 Padma Shri (1991)
 Padma Bhushan (2003)
 Elected Fellowship of the National Academy of Medical Sciences

References

External links

Living people
1938 births
Indian biochemists
Recipients of the Padma Shri in science & engineering
Recipients of the Padma Bhushan in science & engineering
Indian Institute of Science alumni
Directors of the Indian Institute of Science
Recipients of the Shanti Swarup Bhatnagar Award in Biological Science
Fellows of the Indian National Science Academy
Fellows of The National Academy of Sciences, India
Indian biotechnologists
Fellows of the National Academy of Medical Sciences
Academic staff of the Indian Institute of Science
20th-century Indian biologists
20th-century Indian chemists
Scientists from Chennai
Presidency College, Chennai alumni